Niels is a masculine given name.

Niels may also refer to:

 Niels Island, Canada
 Niels Peak, Queen Maud Land, Antarctica
 1720 Niels, an asteroid
 Niels (video gamer) or Zven (born 1997), Danish League of Legends  player

Other uses
 St. Niels, Germany, a Lutheran church